Oowatanite is a compilation album by the Canadian rock band April Wine, released in 1990.

Track listing
All tracks written by Myles Goodwyn unless otherwise noted.
 "Oowatanite" (Jim Clench) – 3:49
 "Get Ready for Love" – 4:10
 "Just Like That" (M. Goodwyn, J. Clench) – 3:11
 "The Band Has Just Begun" (M. Goodwyn, J. Clench) – 4:14
 "Rock n Roll Woman" – 3:42
 "Roller" – 3:36
 "Don't Push Me Around" – 3:13
 "Wanna Rock" – 2:05
 "Highway Hard Run" – 4:00
 "I'm Alive" – 2:51

From the albums
 Electric Jewels (1973) (3, 4)
 Stand Back (1975) (1, 7, 9)
 The Whole World's Goin' Crazy (1976) (5)
 First Glance (1978) (2, 6, 10)
 The Nature of the Beast (1981) (8)

Personnel
 Myles Goodwyn – guitars, keyboards, lead vocals
 Jim Clench – bass, lead vocals
 Steve Lang – bass, background vocals
 Gary Moffet – guitar, slide guitar, background vocals
 Brian Greenway – guitar, slide guitar, vocals
 Jerry Mercer – drums & percussion, background vocals

Various producers
 Myles Goodwyn
 Dino Danelli
 Gene Cornish
 Ralph Murphy
 Nick Blagona

References

April Wine albums
1990 greatest hits albums
Albums produced by Myles Goodwyn
Aquarius Records (Canada) compilation albums
Albums produced by Nick Blagona